Teniente Esteban Martínez is a district and locality in the Presidente Hayes Department of Paraguay. It is located 300 km from Asunción and has a population of 3340 inhabitants. It was established as a category by means of law 3000/06.

References

Populated places in the Presidente Hayes Department